I Am the Day of Current Taste is the final album from math rock band Roadside Monument.

Track listing
 "I Am The Day Of Current Taste" – 7:01
 "OJ Simpson House Auction" – 6:29
 "Taxiriding As An Artform" – 3:50
 "Cops Are My Best Customers" – 6:25
 "The Lifevest" – 6:43
 "Egos The Size Of Cathedrals" – 4:11
 "This City Is Ruthless And So Are You" – 5:41
 "Car Vs Semi, Semi Wins Every Time" – 8:17

Credits
Aaron – Engineer
Chip – Engineer
Eric – Engineer
Jeff Bettger – Keyboards
Alan Douches – Mastering
Johnathon Ford – Bass, Vocals
Matt Johnson – Percussion, Drums
Douglas Lorig – Guitar, Vocals
J. Robbins – Producer, Mixing, Organ

References

Roadside Monument albums
1998 albums
Tooth & Nail Records albums